Ismaël Wagué is a Malian military officer serving as the Deputy Chief of Staff of the Malian Air Force of the Malian Armed Forces.

Wagué gave an interview on France 24, wherein he claimed that the actions of the Malian military was not a coup. He has also pledged that the National Committee for the Salvation of the People will seek a leader to transition Mali from military to civilian rule.

Colonel-Major Ismaël Wagué was appointed to the position of Deputy Chief of Staff of the Air Force in 2019 by president Ibrahim Boubacar Keïta after a series of dismissals in response to a terrorist attack that killed 26 soldiers in Northern Mali.

References 

Year of birth missing (living people)
Malian military personnel
Malian politicians
Living people
21st-century Malian people